Template:image label
 
 

Ansha is a town in Changsha County, northeastern Hunan Province, China.

Divisions of Changsha County
Changsha County